The  Manuel Alves River is a river of Santa Catarina state in southeastern Brazil.

See also
List of rivers of Santa Catarina

References
 map - Ministry of Transport 

Rivers of Santa Catarina (state)